Solomons United Methodist Church is an historic United Methodist church building located at 14454 Solomon's Island Road, South, in Solomons, Calvert County, Maryland.  Our current pastor is the Rev. Dottie Yunger.

References

External links
 Solomons United Methodist Church official website

Churches completed in 1870
19th-century Methodist church buildings in the United States
United Methodist churches in Maryland
Churches in Calvert County, Maryland
Churches in Solomons, Maryland